Retinoid receptors are nuclear receptors (a class of proteins) that bind to retinoids.  When bound to a retinoid, they act as transcription factors, altering the expression of genes with corresponding response elements. Significant age-related declines in the levels of retinoid receptors in the forebrains of rats have been reversed by supplementation with the omega-3 fatty acids eicosapentaenoic acid (EPA) and docosahexaenoic acid (DHA), which can restore neurogenesis.

Subtypes include:

 Retinoic acid receptors (RARs)
 Retinoid X receptors (RXRs)
 RAR-related orphan receptors (RORs)

References

Intracellular receptors